Darío Agustín Ubríaco Medero (born 8 February 1972) is a football referee from Uruguay.

External links

1972 births
Living people
Uruguayan football referees
Place of birth missing (living people)
21st-century Uruguayan people